Tung Hsiang-lung (born 21 September 1952) is a Taiwanese politician and retired Admiral.

Career 

He was the commander of the ROCN from 16 May 2011 to 31 July 2013. He was also the Minister of the Veterans Affairs Council (VAC) from 1 August 2013 to 20 May 2016.

In early October 2013 during a legislative session, he said the VAC will stop issuing subsidies to ROC veterans that are found to hold PRC citizenship, citing the amendment to article 27 of the Act Governing Relations between the People of the Taiwan Area and the Mainland Area that was passed in March 2004. He added that the VAC had found a total of 12 veterans who currently reside in Mainland China and hold PRC nationality. However, if those 12 veterans give up their PRC nationality and apply to reinstate their ROC nationality in the future, they could again apply for the annual subsidy from the VAC.

Commenting on the vast number of retired ROC generals attending the 90th anniversary of Whampoa Military Academy, he said that there were a total of 3,000 retired ROC generals, and that the council had no authority to question the movement and schedule of every retired general since they are basically civilians after retiring from the ROC Armed Forces.

References 

Taiwanese Ministers of the Veterans Affairs Council
Naval War College alumni
Living people
1952 births
Republic of China Navy admirals